The SU-12 self-propelled gun battery (gun truck) was created in 1934 by the Union of Soviet Socialist Republics by mounting a 76 mm regimental gun M1927 onto a modified GAZ-AAA truck, and was in production from 1933 to 1935. The cannon's barrel and recoil system were modified to reduce recoil. It was the Soviet Union's first self-propelled gun. It had a four-man crew, including the driver, and the gun could rotate 270 degrees.

The SU-12 had no armor protection. This was corrected in the SU-1-12 model which added a front shield and roof armor of 4mm thickness. As time went by more armor, in the form of a 2mm rear window and a 4mm rear shield, were added to the SU-1-12 models. Most SU-12 units were decommissioned by 1938, but the Su-1-12 models served in the Battle of Lake Khasan, the Battles of Khalkhin Gol, and in the Winter War against Finland. By 1941 only 3 were left in service and had been supplanted by tracked SPGs.

Other specifications
fording depth=0.82 m
obstacle height=0.75 m
ditch crossing=2 m
ground pressure=0.68 kg/cm2
gun elevation=-5°/+25°
gun range of motion=270°

References

Self-propelled artillery of the Soviet Union
World War II self-propelled artillery
76 mm artillery
Military vehicles introduced in the 1930s